Baby in Vain was an all-girl rock trio from Denmark consisting of Lola Hammerich, Benedicte Pierleoni and Andrea Thuesen. The band was formed in 2010 and their music can be described as grunge, blues and indie-inspired guitar-based noise rock.

Baby in Vain toured as warm-up act for The Floor Is Made Of Lava in the fall of 2012 and performed at the Pavilion Junior Stage at the 2013 Roskilde Festival.

Baby In Vain played a 2014 version of 90s stoner rock and grunge, with heavy guitar riffs and screeching vocals, but still draws in references from sludge and heavy metal.

In 2017 they released their debut album More Nothing.

They received mentions from Mojo Magazine’s Kieron Tyler, Vice and Intro Magazine. They've supported Ty Segall and guitar icon Thurston Moore's band Chelsea Light Moving, and have toured Europe extensively.

Albums 

 2017 More Nothing (Partisan Records)

Singles 

 2016 For The Kids E.P.
 2013 Corny #1/The Thrill
 2013 Taught By Hand/Cowboys
 2013 Seize The End/Alien Arms
 2012 Sweetheart Dreams
 2012 Machine Gun Girl/The Catcher

External links 
 
 
 

Danish rock music groups